Zhang Jing (born 18 March 1977) is a former Chinese ice hockey player. She was a member of the China women's national ice hockey team that played in the 1998 and 2002 Winter Olympics.

References

1977 births
Living people
Chinese women's ice hockey players
Ice hockey players at the 2002 Winter Olympics
Ice hockey players at the 1998 Winter Olympics
Olympic ice hockey players of China
Sportspeople from Harbin
Asian Games gold medalists for China
Asian Games bronze medalists for China
Medalists at the 1999 Asian Winter Games
Medalists at the 2003 Asian Winter Games
Medalists at the 2007 Asian Winter Games
Ice hockey players at the 1999 Asian Winter Games
Ice hockey players at the 2003 Asian Winter Games
Ice hockey players at the 2007 Asian Winter Games
Asian Games medalists in ice hockey